Birkenhead Junction Golf Club Platform served Chester Golf Club in Chester, Cheshire, England, from 1896 to 1927 on the Borderlands line.

History 
The station was opened on 18 May 1896 by the Manchester, Sheffield & Lincolnshire Railway. It was situated to the east of what was Chester Junction, now part of the Dee Marshes cycling route. It replaced the earlier Chester Golf Club Halt to the south. The club building was to the southeast of the southbound platform and further to the south was the signal box. Behind the northbound platform were a set of sidings that served a steelworks. It wasn't shown in public timetables as it was used by members of the nearby golf club and by workmen of the nearby steel works. The station closed on 20 September 1927. The steelworks continued to develop and expand their sidings until the 1970s.

References

External links 

Disused railway stations in Cheshire
Railway stations in Great Britain opened in 1896
Railway stations in Great Britain closed in 1927
1896 establishments in England
1927 disestablishments in England